The Subterranean is a 1967 Romanian war film directed by Virgil Calotescu. It was entered into the 5th Moscow International Film Festival.

Cast
 Leopoldina Bălănuță as Irina
 
 Mircea Bașta
 Emil Botta as Barbu
 Toma Caragiu as Florescu
 Ștefan Ciubotărașu as Zamfir
 Constantin Codrescu
 Iurie Darie as Mircea Tudoran
 Viorica Farkaș (as Viorica Farcas)
 
 Dem Rădulescu

References

External links
 

1967 films
1967 war films
1960s Romanian-language films
Romanian black-and-white films
Romanian war films